Gymnothorax megaspilus, the Oman moray, is a moray eel found in the western Indian Ocean.

References

megaspilus
Fish described in 1995